An An (August 1986 – 21 July 2022) was a male giant panda residing in Ocean Park Hong Kong, a gift from the Central People's Government of China to the Hong Kong Special Administrative Region in 1999. He was the longest-living male giant panda in the world under human care before his death in 2022.

Biography
An An was born in August 1986 in Sichuan, China, and originally lived in Wolong National Nature Reserve, from where he was sent to the Ocean Park in March 1999 as a gift from Beijing to Hong Kong, along with the female giant panda Jia Jia.

In 2017, the 31-year-old An An became the world's longest-lived male giant panda in captivity. Following the death of Jia Jia in 2016, An An continued to live at Ocean Park. His health deteriorated in the last three weeks prior to his euthanisation and he stopped eating solid foods while feeling lethargic. He was euthanised on 21 July 2022, at age 35.

References

1986 animal births
2022 animal deaths
Individual animals in China
Individual giant pandas